Bristol blue glass has been made in Bristol, England, since the 18th century, with a break between the 1920s and 1980s.

History 
During the late 18th century Richard Champion, a Bristol merchant and potter, making Bristol porcelain, was working with a chemist, William Cookworthy. Cookworthy began a search for good quality cobalt oxide to give the blue glaze decoration on the white porcelain and obtained exclusive import rights to all the cobalt oxide from the Royal Saxon Cobalt Works in Saxony. It is uncertain when Bristol blue glass was first made but the quality and beauty of the glass swiftly gained popularity, with seventeen glass houses being set up in the city.

Lazarus and Isaac Jacobs were the most famous makers of Bristol blue glass in the 1780s. Lazarus Jacobs was a Jewish immigrant to Bristol from Frankfurt am Main, Germany. In 1774, at the age of seventeen, Isaac joined his father's glass cutting firm at 108 Temple Street, Bristol, and launched Bristol Blue glass as a national brand, using the cobalt oxide Cookworthy imported. Isaac was responsible for the great growth of the company, and the expansion of its goods. Their company held a royal warrant and made glass for the aristocrats of Europe. Bristol’s glass makers were invited to demonstrate their skills at the Great Exhibition of 1851, opened by Queen Victoria and Prince Albert. At this period cranberry glass was made for the first time by adding 24 carat gold to lead crystal, giving the glass its ruby red tones.

Production ceased in about 1923.

Revival
Around 1970 Thomas Webb & Sons of Stourbridge made a range of about ten Britol blue glass shapes, but had to stop as they found cobalt dust was contaminating their lead crystal. At the request of John Stott, the M.D. of Thomas Webb, (who closed down in 1990), Nazeing Glass of Broxbourne, Herts, started to supply the Bristol Museum and Art Gallery Shop with a range of some twenty glass shapes, all based on 18th century inspired designs, from 1975 until 1990. Bristol-based glass makers James Adlington and Peter Sinclair held their Hot Glass exhibition in 1988 at Hand Made Glass, Bristol. This exhibition led to a revival of Bristol's hand blown glass industry and the creation of a Company that has spawned the careers of many other studio Glassmakers in the South west. Today, Bristol Blue Glass is produced by The Original Bristol Blue Glass Ltd in Brislington, established in 1988.

In the 1990s, John Harvey & Sons of Bristol began to sell Bristol Cream sherry in bottles made from Bristol blue, having shaken off the notion for over 100 years of dangerous and often poisonous liquids being sold in blue bottles.

Production

Chemical composition 

The glass contains cobalt oxide, which creates a deep yet bright blue, and 24% lead oxide (PbO).

See also 

 Cobalt glass
 Glassblowing

References

External links 
 Bristol Blue Glass
 Video of glass blowing at Bristol Blue Glass

Cobalt
Glass types
Culture in Bristol